Diuris fucosa is a species of orchid that is endemic to New South Wales. It between four and seven leaves and up to four pale yellow flowers with a few brown striations. It is only known from two sites in Callitris woodland in the south of the state and is classed as "extinct" in Victoria.

Description
There are two thick, brown, pimply callus ridges near the mid-line of the labellum. Flowering occurs in August and September.

Taxonomy and naming
Diuris fucosa was first formally described in 2006 by David Jones from a specimen collected near Urana and the description was published in Australian Orchid Research. The specific epithet (fucosa) is a Latin word meaning "painted", "simulated" or "counterfeit", referring to the tan-brown markings on the labellum of this orchid.

Distribution and habitat
This orchid grows in Callitris woodland in two locations between Urana and Narrandera, one in a state forest and the other on private property. There are two old collections from Victoria but the species is now classed as "extinct" in that state.

References

fucosa
Endemic orchids of Australia
Orchids of New South Wales
Plants described in 2006